The 3rd European Athletics U23 Championships were held in Amsterdam, Netherlands, at Olympisch Stadion on 12–15 July 2001.

Results
Complete results and medal winners were published.

Men

Women

Medal table

Participation
According to an unofficial count, 737 athletes from 41 countries participated in the event.

 (1)
 (9)
 (2)
 (27)
 (11)
 (2)
 (5)
 (8)
 (1)
 (20)
 (1)
 (7)
 (29)
 (73)
 (71)
 (50)
 (27)
 (25)
 (3)
 (13)
 (1)
 (38)
 (10)
 (14)
 (1)
 (3)
 (23)
 (9)
 (45)
 (16)
 (25)
 (36)
 (1)
 (8)
 (13)
 (45)
 (27)
 (8)
 (4)
 (20)
 (5)

References 

Medalists. GBR Athletics. Retrieved on 2012-06-03.
Day 1 results
Day 2 results
Day 3 results
Day 4 results

 
European Athletics U23 Championships
European U23 Championships
European Athletics U23 Championships, 2001
International athletics competitions hosted by the Netherlands
2000s in Amsterdam
2001 in youth sport
July 2001 sports events in Europe